Sell your cloak and buy a sword is an instruction by Jesus to his disciples during the Last Supper which has been interpreted in several ways.

Interpretation

Fulfillment of prophecy interpretation
Christian anarchist Jacques Ellul and Christian pacifist John Howard Yoder do not believe Luke 22:36 overturns the many times Jesus urged his followers to turn the other cheek and not resist evil when confronted by violence during his Sermon on the Mount and years of ministry. They show when the passage is taken in context (Luke 22:36-38), Jesus is also aware of fulfilling prophecy and makes a surprising statement that two swords are "enough."

Ellul, Yoder and Archie Penner claim that two swords could not possibly have been "enough" to defend Jesus from his pending arrest, trial and execution, so their sole purpose must have been Jesus' wish to fulfill a prophecy (Isaiah 53:9-12). As Ellul explains:

This theory is further substantiated by Peter when Peter draws one of the swords a few hours later at Jesus' arrest in the Garden of Gethsemane, slashing the ear of Malchus, one of the priests' servants, and Jesus rebukes him saying: "Put up again thy sword into his place: for all they that take the sword shall perish with the sword."(Matthew 26:52)

Jamieson, Fausset and Brown, in their 1871 biblical commentary, indicate "...And He said to them, It is enough - not 'Two swords will suffice,' but 'Enough of this for the present'. The warning had been given, and preparation for coming dangers hinted at; but as His meaning had not been apprehended in the comprehensive sense in which it was meant, He wished to leave the subject".

Motyer, Stibbs and Wiseman in New Bible Commentary: Revised Third Edition (1977) states:

Figurative
Pope Boniface VIII referred to the two swords in the medieval papal bull Unam sanctam, to represent the temporal and spiritual authority of the church. He wrote: "We are informed by the texts of the gospels that in this Church and in its power are two swords; namely, the spiritual and the temporal. For when the Apostles say: "Behold, here are two swords" [Lk 22:38] that is to say, in the Church, since the Apostles were speaking, the Lord did not reply that there were too many, but sufficient."

Theologian John Gill said in his Exposition of the Entire Bible:

See also
 Not peace, but a sword

References

Christian terminology
Gospel of Luke
New Testament words and phrases
Sayings of Jesus
Swords